The German automotive concern, Volkswagen Group has, since the 1970s, developed a series of shared automobile platforms for their motor vehicles.

Originally, these were identified using a simple alphanumeric system.  The first letter prefix indicates the car classification or physical size (A, B, C or D - for 'traditional' cars); followed by a number to enumerate different generations of the same class.  However, more recent platforms have formally departed from this convention, although the older alphanumeric codes continue to be used informally.

These platforms may be used by one or more marques of the Group.

Platform codes

Original system

Note that some designations in common use are ambiguous; i.e. in some cases the same platform designation is used for different models that do not share a common platform.  An example would be the B6 designation - this is used to identify the  2001-2005 Audi A4 (and the related Audi S4), which uses a longitudinal engine and transmission placement with a pressed steel front subframe; however it is also used to identify the sixth-generation Volkswagen Passat, but this uses a transverse engine and transmission placement with a very different cast aluminium alloy front subframe.

Joint-venture platforms
Platforms developed by Volkswagen Group as joint ventures with other manufacturers have designations which do not conform to the above scheme. These include:

Current system
More recently, Volkswagen Group have introduced a new alphanumeric nomenclature for car platforms. The platform code is composed as follows:

 A letter, P, indicating a passenger car platform
 A letter indicating the configuration of the engine:
 Q indicates a transverse engine (Quer in German)
 L indicates a longitudinal engine (Längs in German)
 A digit indicating the platform size or class
 A digit indicating the generation or evolution

An additional + suffix indicates a long-wheelbase variant.

Modular component systems
In 2007, Volkswagen Group introduced a more flexible "modular component system" architecture on which to base future platforms.  Four such component systems were planned:  However, models developed from these modular component systems may also be identified by PL/PQ platform designations.

MQB: Modularer Querbaukasten, or "modular transverse component system", for transverse engined, small to medium-sized cars.
MLB: Modularer Längsbaukasten, or "modular longitudinal component system", for medium-sized and larger (front- or all-wheel drive) longitudinal engined models.
MSB: Modularer Standardantriebsbaukasten, or "modular standard drive train system", for front-engined (rear- or all-wheel drive) cars (the titular "standard" drive train).
MMB: Modularer Mittelbaukasten, for mid-engined or rear-engined sports cars. Currently used by the Porsche 992 911 and the Porsche 982 718.
MSS: Modulare Aufhängungslösung, or  "Modular Suspension Solution", for Modular Sports Car System
MNB: Modulare Nutzfahrzeugbaukasten, for light commercial vehicles (VW Crafter/MAN TGE).

Electric car platforms 
J1: J1 Platform underpins the Porsche Taycan and Auto e-Tron GT. It is derived from the MSB platform.
MEB: Modularer Elektrobaukasten is an electric car platform developed by Volkswagen Group.
PPE: Premium Platform Electric for larger electric car models co-developed by Audi and Porsche.
SSP: Scalable Systems Platform is planned to be introduced in 2026.

Other
The Volkswagen Amarok pickup truck has no known platform code.

References

External links
Volkswagen Group corporate website